Ngarenanyuki is an administrative ward in the Meru District  of the Arusha Region of Tanzania. The ward is the largest ward in Meru district. It is located in far north side of the distric. According to the 2002 census, the ward has a total population of 16,988.

References

Wards of Meru District
Wards of Arusha Region